The 2018 Philadelphia Fusion season was the first season of the Philadelphia Fusion's existence in the Overwatch League. The team finished with a regular season record of 24–16, which was the fifth best in the Overwatch League. Philadelphia had the same record as the London Spitfire, but London held the tiebreaker by map differential. Philadelphia qualified for the Stage 2 playoffs, in which they lost in the finals against the New York Excelsior. The team also qualified for the Season Playoffs, in which they lost in the Grand Finals against the London Spitfire.

Preceding offseason 
On November 3, 2017, Fusion announced their inaugural season roster, consisting of the following players:
Lee "Carpe" Jae-hyeok
Simon "Snillo" Ekström
Georgii "ShaDowBurn" Gushcha
Josue "Eqo" Corona
Kim "SADO" Su-min
Joona "fragi" Laine
Alberto "Neptuno" González Molinillo
Park "DayFly" Jeong-hwan
Joseph "Joemeister" Gramano
Isaac "Boombox" Charles
Choi "Hotba" Hong-jun
Gael "Poko" Gouzerch
Due to "player logistics issues," the Philadelphia Fusion did not participate in preseason play.

Review

Regular season 
Philadelphia's first regular season OWL match was a 3–2 victory against the Houston Outlaws on January 11. On January 25, Philadelphia upset the undefeated New York Excelsior, which marked New York's only loss in Stage 1. With a lack of preparation time heading into the regular season, the team struggled for form in Stage 1 and would only manage to notch 6 victories, missing the Stage 1 Playoffs.

Using the stage-break to catch up on lost practice time and welcoming the arrival of Israeli DPS player Josue "Eqo" Corana, Stage 2 would prove to be a turning point for the team. After opening up the stage with back-to-back sweeps over the Boston Uprising and Florida Mayhem, the team would continue to impress and go on to achieve a much improved 3rd-place finish – good enough for a stage playoffs berth. During the Stage 2 Playoffs, the team surprised many after defeating heavily favored Stage 1 champions London Spitfire in the semi-finals, however a finals match-up with the New York Excelsior would prove a juggernaut too much as the Fusion would fall short in a hard-fought 5-map match.

Heading into the final match of Stage 3 on May 5, the Fusion needed a win over the Los Angeles Valiant for a shot to claim the 4th seed in the Stage 3 playoff bracket. However, the Valiant proved too much to handle, as they defeated the Fusion by a score of 3–2 and claimed the 4th seed for their own.

After Dallas Fuel's upset 3–1 win over the Los Angeles Valiant on June 15, Philadelphia needed a 4–0 sweep over the London Spitfire in order to make the Stage 4 Playoffs. While the Fusion were victorious in that matchup, they were only able to win by a score of 3–1 and subsequently, missed the Stage 4 Playoffs.

Season playoffs 
Philadelphia Fusion claimed the 6th seed in the Season Playoffs on June 15, after Seoul Dynasty lost to the Los Angeles Gladiators. During the Post-Season Playoffs, Philadelphia Fusion first faced the Boston Uprising. After a dominant first game they lost the second one, forcing a tie-breaker game which Fusion managed to win. After that they faced the New York Excelsior, who were heavy favorites to win the Post-Season playoffs. Fusion upset them in the first game, winning 3–0 and then narrowly winning the second game 3–2, which sent them to the grand finals. In the Grand Finals they faced another underdog; the London Spitifire. The Spitfire however showed the potential their team had and beat the Fusion in a best-of-3-game series, winning 2–0.

Final roster

Standings

Record by stage

League

Game log

Regular season

Playoffs

References 

2018 Overwatch League seasons by team
Philadelphia Fusion
Philadelphia Fusion seasons